Rainey Memorial Gates is a historic entrance gate located at the north side of the Bronx Zoo, within Bronx Park in the Bronx, New York City. It was built in 1934 and constructed of sculpted bronze in the Art Deco style. It was designed by noted sculptor Paul Manship (1885–1966), who worked on them starting in 1926. It stands as a memorial to noted big game hunter Paul James Rainey (1877–1923). The gates feature stylized animal and plant life including the figure of a seated lion.  Low bronze screens flank the gate and connect it to the granite gatekeepers lodges.  The gates are topped by 26 ton slabs of granite.

It is a New York City designated landmark and was listed on the National Register of Historic Places in 1972.

See also
List of New York City Designated Landmarks in The Bronx
National Register of Historic Places in Bronx County, New York

References

1934 establishments in New York City
1934 sculptures
Bronze sculptures in New York City
Buildings and structures completed in 1934
Buildings and structures in the Bronx
Buildings and structures on the National Register of Historic Places in New York City
Gates in the United States
New York City Designated Landmarks in the Bronx
Monuments and memorials on the National Register of Historic Places in New York (state)
National Register of Historic Places in the Bronx
Outdoor sculptures in New York City
Works by Paul Manship
Art Deco architecture in the Bronx
Bronx Park